Villers-le-Rond is a commune in the Meurthe-et-Moselle department in north-eastern France.

Geography
The river Othain forms all of the commune's western border.

See also
Communes of the Meurthe-et-Moselle department

References

Villerslerond